"Balozi" Robert Zayd Muhammad Harvey (January 26, 1940 – December 28, 2016) was an American diplomat, community organizer, activist and executive director, based in New Jersey and New York. Balozi worked both domestically and internationally toward the growth and betterment of African-American communities in the U.S. while fostering relationships with Caribbean and African Nations. Harvey was given the title "Balozi" in Tanzania by President Julius K. “Mwalimu” Nyerere in 1964. "Balozi" means "ambassador" or "statesman" in Swahili.

Early life, family, and education
Robert Alexander Harvey was born in East Orange, New Jersey on January 26, 1940, to Clifton Harvey and Willie Bell Harvey, who raised their son Catholic. His father was a cook for Marcus Garvey and an activist in the Pan-African Movement, who mentored Balozi in his early childhood about his black race, African values, and African-American legacy. He made a pledge to his father that when he grew up he would help his African-American brothers and sisters discover and live their true African heritage. Balozi’s early years of formal education were spent in the City of East Orange Public Schools system. He graduated from East Orange High School in 1957 and enlisted in the United States Air Force where he served with the Strategic Air Command for four years before being honorably discharged in 1961. He went on to study at Seton Hall University, where his major was political science. After graduating college, Harvey attended The United Nations language school in New York where he learned Swahili, Mandarin Chinese, Arabic, and Zulu. In 1965, Harvey converted from Christianity to Islam by joining The Nation of Islam, where he later became a strong advocate for the holiday Kwanzaa. He married Karimu F. Hill in 1979, who served as the Judge of the Municipal Court of East Orange. Balozi and Karimu F. Hill had six children together

Activism and diplomacy
In 1961, the same year as his discharge, Harvey took a position with the Tanzanian Mission to the United Nations, where his involvement with the Black Power Movement helped him see the parallels between the fight for civil rights in America and the fight against colonialism. He worked to help other people of African descent to "locate their Blackness through feelings of exile and against the backdrop of a postcolonial Africa." A few years later, in 1964, Harvey returned to Africa as a personal guest of President Julius K. “Mwalimu” Nyerere of the United Republic of Tanzania, a proponent of North-South Dialogue who named him “Balozi” (Swahili for ambassador and/or statesman). In 1966, 18 months after his return to the United States, he served as the Job Recruiter for Tanzania, where he placed many African-Americans in professional and technical positions.

In 1967, Balozi founded and became Chairman of the Black Community Development Organization, a grass-roots community organization helping to instill Afrocentric values in African-American youth in various communities within Essex County, New Jersey. Balozi attended the inaugural Kwanzaa celebration launched by Dr. Malanga Karenga in Los Angeles, California in 1967.

Balozi participated in a 1968 rally against the proposed construction of the Route 75 highway, an eight lane highway planned to run North to South, would have cut the Central Ward in half and displaced thousands of Black and Puerto Rican residents. His political drive and campaign efforts aided in electing Kenneth A. Gibson, the first Black mayor of Newark, in 1970. Harvey continued his international work through the Newark mayor's office as a Special Aide in the Office of Hon. Kenneth A. Gibson, for whom he handled international relations and protocol.

Between 1970 and 1973, Harvey operated as a Non-Governmental Organization (NGO) Representative to the United Nations for the Congress of African People. From 1973 to 1977, Harvey headed the Drug & Alcohol Control for the City of East Orange, New Jersey under the leadership of Mayor William S. Hart. He was then assigned as Mayoral Liaison to the UN where he worked to expand and strengthen trade between developing nations and Newark, New Jersey. In 1978, Harvey worked as Mayoral Liaison to the Newark-Rutgers University Small Business Development Center, and he also served as the President of the Newark United Nations Association.
 
In 1982, Harvey was appointed executive director of the HTWTI, Harlem Third World Trade Institute, as well international trade and investment promotion agency HUDC, The Harlem Urban Development Corporation in New York City. The Institute is responsible for the hosting and partnership of countless distinguished government officials and business leaders. That year, he also served as a consultant to the Black Caucus of Local Elected Officials.

During his 13 years as executive director, the Institute facilitated international transactions in excess of $30 million. In addition, 47 Heads of State and Government from Africa, the Caribbean, Latin America, and South Pacific Islands, as well as over 400 high-level government and business leaders visited Harlem, USA as guests of the Institute and HUDC. HTWTI facilitated trade and investment relations between American, small, minority and women-owned firms, and developing countries; and promoted the development of the proposed $150 million Harlem International Trade Center.

In 1983, the United Nations African and Caribbean Diplomatic Corps, under the joint chairmanship of Ambassador Oumarou G. Youssoufou, Executive Secretary of the Organization of African Unity to the United Nations and Ambassador Serge Charles of Haiti, honored Balozi at a Testimonial Dinner for his twenty years of distinguished service and commitment to Pan-African solidarity and cooperation. A year later, he formed and became chairman of the Essex County Pan-African Cultural Society. Harvey was also elected to the Board of Directors of the New York City Partnership, Inc., “a coalition of business and civic leaders dedicated to improving the quality of life in New York City.” The Partnership was headed by David Rockefeller, Chairman of Chase Manhattan Bank.

Harvey worked closely with several foreign dignitaries. He was installed as King Nana Kablam I of the Village of Azzuretti in the Ivory Coast. He was appointed as Special Presidential Envoy of the Government of Liberia by President of the Republic of Liberia, H.E. Charles G. Taylor. He was named the North American Representative and Spokesman for Cheikh Moutada M’Backe, spiritual leader of the Mourid Islamic Community headquartered in Touba, Senegal. Harvey served as the President of the Mourid Islamic Community in America (MICA). At the time, he was reportedly the only American to head a predominantly African Sufi organization.

Balozi was honored at the Rites of Passage ceremony at the Alexandria Balloon Festival in Pittstown in August 1994. The event was attended by about 25 chiefs from Africa and their queens.

In 1995, Balozi formed and became Chairman of Balozi & Associates (B&A), an international trade and investment consulting firm focused on exploring business opportunities in emerging African and Caribbean market economies. The firm opened offices in New York City, East Orange (New Jersey), London, Paris and Monrovia (Liberia), even developing an $800 million satellite project in Africa with client ACTEL in conjunction with Lockheed Martin. Balozi was Director of Global Mining Consultants (England) and Director of Guardian Scientific Africa (USA). Additionally, that year he established and became Chairman/CEO of His Majesty Traders, a business entity, and later founded and became Chairman of Human Bridges, Inc., a nonprofit charity.

A resident of Essex County, Harvey was appointed Director of OCDAA, the Office of Cultural Diversity and Affirmative Action, in 2003. Through his post, he served as a member of the Essex County Disparity Study Commission and the Essex County Juvenile Justice Disparities Working Group. In 2004, Harvey was appointed as executive director of the EDC, the Essex County Economic Development Corporation and Essex County Office of Cultural Diversity and Affirmative Action, serving in the role until 2007. A year later, in January 2004, Balozi was appointed as executive director of the Essex County Economic Development Corporation (EDC) by County Executive DiVincenzo.

Later years 
Since 1982, Harvey had resided in South Orange, New Jersey, USA.

In his last few years, Harvey  dedicated his life towards building cultural bridges between and among Africans and peoples of African descent in other countries; promoting the economic and political development of African-American communities, and African and Caribbean nations; and forging relationships between and among peoples of all races and nationalities.

Harvey retired from his diplomatic career in September 2007, with many activists, leaders, politicians, educators, professionals and members of the diplomatic community from Africa, Asia, Latin America, Europe and the Islands gathering to pay homage to Balozi.

In 2008, Harvey participated in the "Bridging the Gap" Symposium presented by Newark Mayor Cory A. Booker's African Commission and the African Institute of Essex County College to discuss political relationships between the people of African descent at home and abroad.  In 2009, he was an honorary committee member for Amiri Baraka's 75th birthday celebration, along with Maya Angelou and Danny Glover.

He was a member of the Essex County Workforce Investment Board (WIB) and served as the County Executive’s Municipal Liaison to the Township of Irvington, New Jersey. On April 26, 2016, the NAACP Chapter of the Oranges and Maplewood awarded Harvey its Presidential Award.

Art collection 
On the return flight of his first trip to Tanzania in 1961, Harvey discovered the rich artistic history of the African continent. Since then, he made over 200 trips to the continent, collecting around 300 pieces of art and artifacts representing more than 100 distinct African tribes, histories, and ancestries. His collection is described as "one of the premier private collections of African art in the United States. Even many museum collections...fail to match the diversity and uniqueness of the pieces found in Harvey's home," all of which are authentic pieces. Some were gifts from African leaders he met during his travels; others he rescued from potential destruction. All of this he collected with the goal of "preserving history for future generations." As with his activism and diplomatic work, he prioritized connecting African-Americans to their ancestry and fostering a relationship between the African continent and black Americans who had lost their ties to their cultural past, and his private collection served as a way to preserve and protect history while acknowledging the distinction between Africans living in America and Afro-Americans, particularly those Afro-Americans with generations of family members within the African diaspora.

Harvey gave opening remarks at the 20th Cheikh Ahmadou Bamba Annual Day at the United Nations Headquarters on July 28, 2008. He encouraged everyone there to celebrate Ahmadou Bamba to wear traditional African dress, something he began to do himself in 1987 in homage to his friend President Sankara of Burkina Faso, who was assassinated that year. He emphasized for those within the African Diaspora  wearing black and green to distinguish themselves from their African brothers were dressed in white. He saw art and color as creating a visual epistemology for identity construction.

Death 
Harvey died on December 28, 2016, at the age of 76. Newark mayor Ras Baraka issued a statement following Harvey's death, stating "Few have done more to build bridges between African nations and the Black communities of America."

Following Harvey's death, Essex County Executive Joseph N. DiVincenzo, Jr. dedicated a bronze plaque in his honor in Essex County's Legend Way. The bronze plaque reads: "Balozi Harvey dedicated his life to building cultural bridges among Pan African people; promoting economic, trade and political development of Pan-African diaspora communities; and forging relations between people of all nationalities and races, at home and abroad. As a teenager, Balozi pledged to his father, a cook for Marcus Garvey and an activist in the Back-to-Africa movement, that he would carry forth the message of African heritage. He remained true to his word. After school and the USAF, he attended the United Nations Language School, learning Swahili, Mandarin Chinese, Arabic and Zulu. Balozi labored with spiritual leaders including Imam Warith D. Muhammad, the Dalai Lama, Dr. Maulana Karenga, Cheikh Mourtada Mbacké and the Archdiocese of NY & NJ, and was invited to many African & Caribbean nations. He also became a Kwanzaa leader. From 2003-2007, he served as Director of the Essex County Office of Cultural Diversity and Affirmative Action and Executive Director of the County’s Economic Development Corp. Balozi’s was a life well-lived. Therefore, ‘he shall be counted and honored among the ancestors. His name shall endure as a monument and what he’s done on earth shall never perish or pass away,’ The Husia.”

References

1940 births
2016 deaths
American community activists
African-American activists
East Orange High School alumni
People from East Orange, New Jersey
Seton Hall University alumni
20th-century African-American people
21st-century African-American people